The Ellis Drive Historical Area is an older section of the UMass Amherst containing many of the university's earliest laboratory buildings. Several of these buildings have since been converted for other uses, but research still continues in many of them to this day.

Historic buildings
 Agricultural Engineering North
 Chenoweth Laboratory
 Draper Hall
 Draper Annex
 East Experiment Station
 Flint Laboratory
 Goessmann Laboratory
 Hatch Laboratory
 Skinner Hall
 Stockbridge Hall
 West Experiment Station

Other buildings
 Hasbrouck Laboratory
 John W. Lederle Graduate Research Center
 Murray D. Lincoln Campus Center
 Physical Plant Complex
 Worcester Dining Commons

Former buildings
The Boarding House
Abigail Adams House
Infirmary Houses
Marshall Hall

External links
 2007 Legacy Buildings Report

University of Massachusetts Amherst buildings